A work rule is a negotiated stipulation in a labor contract that limits the conditions under which management may direct the performance of labor.

References

Labor relations
Contract clauses